Jezlan Dasht (also Romanized as Jezlān Dasht and Jazlān Dasht; also known as Dzhezrandasht, Jazārandasht, and Jezrāndasht) is a village in Darram Rural District, in the Central District of Tarom County, Zanjan Province, Iran. At the 2006 census, its population was 443, in 115 families.

References 

Populated places in Tarom County